Osler's sign may refer to:

 Osler's sign, pseudohypertension
 Osler's sign, pretibial myxedema
 Osler's sign, Osler's node, which are nodes associated with acute bacterial endocarditis